Georgianna Lincoln (born February 22, 1943) is an American politician and businesswoman.

Born in Fairbanks, Alaska Territory, Lincoln graduated from Lathrop High School in Fairbanks, Alaska in 1960. She also went to University of Alaska Fairbanks. She lived in Fairbanks and in the village of Rampart. Lincoln was involved with the commercial fishing industry and served on the board of directors of the Alaska Native Claims Settlement Act (ANCSA) regional corporation, Doyon, Limited. She was a member of the Alaska Commission on Judicial Conduct from 1984 to 1990. Lincoln served in the Alaska House of Representatives in 1991 and 1992. She then served in the Alaska Senate from 1993 to 2005 and in 1996 was the Democratic nominee for United States Congress.

References

|-

|-

1943 births
Alaska Native people
Democratic Party Alaska state senators
Businesspeople from Fairbanks, Alaska
Lathrop High School (Alaska) alumni
Living people
Democratic Party members of the Alaska House of Representatives
Native American state legislators in Alaska
Politicians from Fairbanks, Alaska
People from Yukon–Koyukuk Census Area, Alaska
University of Alaska Fairbanks alumni
Women state legislators in Alaska
21st-century American women